Norsk Data was a minicomputer manufacturer located in Oslo, Norway. Existing from 1967 to 1998, it had its most active period from the early 1970s to the late 1980s. At the company's peak in 1987, it was the second largest company in Norway and employed over 4,500 people.

Throughout its history Norsk Data produced a long string of extremely innovative systems, with a disproportionately large number of world firsts. Some examples of this are the NORD-1, the first minicomputer to have memory paging as a standard option, and the first machine to have floating-point instructions standard, the NORD-5, the world's first 32-bit minicomputer (beating the VAX, often claimed the first, by 6 years).

Historical overview

The origins of Norsk Data go back to the development of digital computers at the Norwegian Defense Research Establishment at Kjeller, Norway, where several early computers had been designed, such as the SAM and the SAM 2, also known as the FLINK.

The success of this program resulted in the founding of A/S Nordata – Norsk Data Elektronikk on August 8, 1967, by Lars Monrad Krohn, Per Bjørge and Rolf Skår. The company became a significant supplier of minicomputers to many research projects, in particular to CERN in Geneva, Switzerland, where they were chosen to produce the computers for many projects, starting with the SPS Project, Norsk Data's international breakthrough contract. The other market segments Norsk Data succeeded in were process control, Norwegian municipal administration data centers, newspapers, as well as parts of the educational, health, and university sector.

For a period in 1987, Norsk Data was the second largest company by stock value in Norway, second only to Norsk Hydro, and employed over 4,500 people.

In March 1991, shortly after the January Events, Norsk Data donated the first computer to Lithuanian Institute of Mathematics and Informatics. This donation started the development of LITNET, an academic and research network in Lithuania. Later that year, the network connection lines directly connecting Vilnius to Moscow were shut down. With the help of additional hardware donated by Norsk Data, Lithuania was able to use its first satellite-based Internet connection, which operated at 9,6 kbit/s. This was the first Lithuanian communications line that was totally independent from the former Soviet Union.

After a long period of exceptional success, the Norsk Data "empire" collapsed in the early 1990s, mostly due to not realizing the impact of the PC revolution (as well as the growing competition from UNIX-based workstations). Norsk Data technology was continued by Dolphin. Norsk Data was purchased by Telenor and went through several rebrands and relaunches.

Notable innovations
Throughout the times, Norsk Data produced a long string of innovative computers. Some examples of this include:

 The NORD-1, the first minicomputer to have memory paging as a standard option, and the first machine to have floating-point instructions standard
 The NORD-5, the world's first 32-bit minicomputer – beating the VAX, often claimed to be first – by 6 years
 The NORD-100, a very early application of bitslicing in minicomputers
 The KPS (Knowledge Process System), developed in joint venture with Racal plc, a system which pioneered running a multi-user LISP machine environment

Post-breakup companies
Although the Norsk Data breakup caused a large number of layoffs, a large number of employees and intellectual property lived on in various smaller companies. Some went bankrupt quite quickly, some were bought for tax purposes.

The hardware research and development group was split off into Dolphin Server Technology in 1989. Dolphin later split off into a number of companies, by far the most successful of these being Dolphin Interconnect Solutions, a cluster interconnect hardware company.

Norsk Data UK
In the UK, Telenor kept the Norsk Data name for several years, focusing in on hardware support and maintenance contracts, mainly with HMCG and local governments.

At the tail end of the "dotcom boom" Telenor decided to try and expand the service by acquiring the ISP CIX  and XTML, a hosting company in Manchester, UK. The total expenditure on acquisitions was more than £50 million.

The name and business focus of this group of companies was changed several times in the early 21st Century, being known as Nextra  (along with the acquired CIX & XTML), Telenor Business Solutions (still with CIX & XTML) and finally reverting to ND Norsk Data once CIX & XTML had been resold to Pipex, reportedly for less than 10% of the purchase price.

Much of the loss in value of the acquired companies was put down to the astronomical "goodwill" payment included in the purchase price during the "dotcom boom". ND Norsk Data was then renamed 2e2, and with 2e2 came the acquisition of part of Pink Roccade. This bolstered the hardware maintenance side of the company. The growth by acquisition trend continued with several smaller businesses being taken on, and many employees subsequently being laid off. Major losses of high earning contracts such as Thomas Cook, Woolworths, HMP, or Corus, were never replaced with similar-sized customers.

Hardware
Significant Norsk Data computer models include:
NORD-1, 16-bit minicomputer launched in 1968, could run TSS (see below) from 1971
NORD-5, 32-bit supermini launched in 1972
NORD-9,
NORD-10, 16-bit mini launched in 1973
NORD-10/S, version of the Nord-10 with cache, paging, and other improvements
NORD-50, second generation 32-bit supermini in 1975
NORD-100, 16-bit, from 1978, later renamed ND-100. First single-board 16-bit minicomputer CPU.
ND-500, third generation 32-bit supermini in 1981
ND-505, 28-bit computer allowed through the CoCom embargo of the Eastern bloc
ND-5000 ("Samson"), fourth generation 32-bit supermini in 1987 (5400, 5700, 5800)
ND-5850 ("Rallar"), fifth generation 32-bit supermini in 1987
ND-5900-2, ND-5900-3, and ND-5904, dual-, triple- and quad-CPU 5000 series machines.
ND-88000 – ND implementation of the Motorola MC88000 RISC for Unix/NDix – 1987

Software
In addition to hardware, Norsk Data also produced a wide range of system and application software:

NORD-TSS – Nord Time Sharing System from 1971
SINTRAN – Operating system for Nord 10 and later models, version III from 1973, III/VS in 1974
 XMSG – OSI based (X21 and X.25) communication system, integrated with SINTRAN, with support for both synchronous and asynchronous communication in 1974 and on. Full LU 6.2 support in 1982
SIBAS database based on the Codasyl database specifications was ported by the Central Institute for Industrial Research in 1975 SIBAS is owned by SRS.
FORTRAN compiler
ND-Paint Graphic editing – Windows based
BASIC compiler developed in Kiel and Mülheim an der Ruhr, Germany with the CAT-System (Common Abstract Tree-Language) using the Vienna Development Method, 1983
COBOL compiler
C compiler for ND-100/ND-500 developed by University of Luleå, and IAR Systems AB, Sweden, in cooperation with Norsk Data A.S, 1984. A later C compiler developed in Kiel and Mülheim an der Ruhr, Germany with the CAT-System using the Vienna Development Method, 1987.
ND-COSMOS – computer networking system
PLANC compiler – PLANC was the system language of Norsk Data – a language "defined by its implementation", similar to C, but assignment left to right, as you read: A + 1 =: A same as A++
Pascal compiler developed by Prof. Dr. Hans Langmaack and his team at Kiel University in Germany with the CAT-System using the Vienna Development Method, 1987
PED – "Programmer's EDitor" Screen oriented text editor
LED – "Language-sensitive programmer's EDitor" Screen oriented text editor and debugger – complete Integrated Development Environment made for own use.
ND-NOTIS – Integrated, modular word processing and office application suite with ties to database and customer applications.
NORTEXT – typesetting system integrated with ND-NOTIS and SIBAS
Lisp Machine Lisp – MIT Lisp machine lisp developed in a joint venture Racal-Norsk (ZetaLisp).
Technovision – CAD system developed in Mülheim an der Ruhr, Germany. Technovision was a modular CAD/CAM system which was internationally considered to be one of the best on the market. It was in part designed by Norsk Data Dietz GmbH. A special workstation named the Technostation was designed specifically for running Technovision. It was extremely well received by international press, and even won a design award.
BIBDIA – Library system developed by Norsk Data Dietz GmbH in Mülheim an der Ruhr, Germany. BIBDIA was further developed by BiBer GmbH since 1992. The current WEB-based version is still running as a market leader in Germany and Switzerland.

In addition to the above: 
 two batch languages, called JEC and XCOM. JEC were used primarily as a simple batch job controller, whereas XCOM was used for much more involved routines such as operating system patches etc. Most of the applications came in two different editions, one compiled for the NORD-10/ND-100 series and one compiled for the ND-500/ND-5000 series.
 ND spun off NOTIS-WP and NOTIS-RG into NOTIS AS, which later changed its name to Maxware. NOTIS-QL was copied by Microsoft, where it is called Access (the internal name for NOTIS-QL was "Access-1") but the original was sold to Sysdeco and sold now with the name "QBEVision".

Tim Berners-Lee connection
The World Wide Web originated when Tim Berners-Lee wrote the ENQUIRE program in Pascal on a Norsk Data NORD-10 running under SINTRAN III at CERN. They also used ND-NOTIS, that was based on SGML, and emailed with NOTIS-MAIL, using tcp/ip, coded in HTML.

References

External links
 Norsk Data Forum - a Norwegian site operated by ND ex-employees.
 A commercial Norsk Data-related home page
 Norsk Data Pakistan Private Limited
 Computer-Archiv - Norsk Data
 A Norsk Data page operated by Tore Bekkedal
 Norsk Data's history by Jonny Oddene
 NDWiki, The Norsk Data encyclopedia
 BiBer GmbH - a German Company founded by ND ex-employees.

 
Minicomputers
Defunct computer hardware companies
Defunct companies of Norway
Computer companies of Norway